The R443 road is a regional road in Ireland, which forms the northern and western part of an orbital route around the town of Tullamore. The southern and eastern part is formed by the N52 Tullamore bypass. The R443 commences at a roundabout junction with the N52/N80. From here it travels along Clonminch Road (former N80) and O'Moore Street; it then joins the R421 (former N52) for a distance of 400 metres along Cormac Street. The road then continues along the "Western Relief Road" along the western edge of the town. It has roundabout junctions with the R420 Clara Road (former N80) and the R421 Arden Road (former N52) in addition to other roundabouts for industrial, retail and residential estates. The road terminates at a roundabout with the N52 Tullamore bypass on the northern side of the town. The total length of the road is 8.2km.

See also
Roads in Ireland
National primary road
National secondary road

References 
Roads Act 1993 (Classification of Regional Roads) Order 2006 – Department of Transport

Regional roads in the Republic of Ireland
Roads in County Offaly